Pavel Dmitrievich Kraskovsky (born September 11, 1996) is a Russian professional ice hockey player. He is currently playing with Lokomotiv Yaroslavl of the Kontinental Hockey League (KHL).

Playing career
Kraskovsky made his Kontinental Hockey League (KHL) debut playing with Lokomotiv Yaroslavl during the 2013–14 KHL season.  On June 26, 2014, Kraskovsky was drafted in the 6th round of the 2014 NHL Entry Draft (164th overall) by the Winnipeg Jets of the National Hockey League

International play

Kraskovsky competed for Russia in the 2014 IIHF World U18 Championship.

Career statistics

Regular season and playoffs

International

References

External links

1996 births
Living people
Lokomotiv Yaroslavl players
Russian ice hockey forwards
Sportspeople from Yaroslavl
Winnipeg Jets draft picks